Rob Peeters (born 2 July 1985) is a Belgian former professional racing cyclist, who primarily competed in the cyclo-cross discipline of the sport. In January 2012, he finished second at the UCI Cyclo-cross World Championships. He also competed in road bicycle racing, winning the mountains classification at the 2015 Ster ZLM Toer.

Personal life
His cousin Yannick Peeters and uncle Wilfried Peeters were also professional cyclists.

Major results

2004–2005
 3rd Hoogstraten, Under-23 Superprestige
2005–2006
 3rd Hofstade, UCI Under-23 World Cup
 3rd Grand Prix van Hasselt Under-23
 3rd Koppenbergcross Under-23
2006–2007
 1st Krawatencross Under-23
 1st Herdenkingscross Under-23
 2nd National Under-23 Championships
 2nd Azencross Under-23
 2nd Grand Prix van Hasselt Under-23
 2nd Koppenbergcross Under-23
 3rd  European Under-23 Championships
 3rd Overall Under-23 Superprestige
3rd Ruddervoorde
3rd Gavere
3rd Bollekescross
3rd Diegem
3rd Hoogstraten
 UCI Under-23 Cyclo-cross World Cup
3rd Kalmthout
3rd Hofstade
2007–2008
 1st Grand Prix de Ster
 1st Grand Prix de Denain
2008–2009
 2nd Grand Prix de la Région Wallonne
 3rd Grand Prix van Hasselt
2009–2010
 1st Lanarvily
 1st Grand Prix DAF Grand Garage Engel
 1st Rutland, National Trophy Series
 2nd Centrumcross Surhuisterveen
2010–2011
 1st Kasteelcross Zonnebeke
 2nd Stříbro, Toi Toi Cup
 3rd Grand Prix de la Commune de Contern
2011–2012
 1st Kasteelcross Zonnebeke
 2nd  UCI World Championships
 2nd Leuven
 2nd Grand Prix de la Commune de Contern
 2nd Rad Racing GP
 3rd National Championships
 3rd Gieten, Superprestige
 3rd Grand Prix Rouwmoer, GvA Trophy
 3rd CrossVegas
2012–2013
 1st Centrumcross Surhuisterveen
 2nd Essen, BPost Bank Trophy
2013–2014
 2nd National Championships
 2nd Azencross, BPost Bank Trophy
 2nd Bredenecross
 3rd Heerlen
 3rd Otegem
 3rd Jaarmarktcross Niel
 3rd Cyclocross van het Waasland
2014–2015
 3rd Otegem
 3rd Essen
2015–2016
 2nd Cyclo-cross Zonhoven, Superprestige
 2nd Kasteelcross Zonnebeke
2016–2017
 1st Qiansen Trophy Yanqing Station
2017–2018
 2nd Rochester Cyclocross Day 1
 3rd Rochester Cyclocross Day 2

References

External links

1985 births
Living people
Belgian male cyclists
Cyclo-cross cyclists
People from Geel
Cyclists from Antwerp Province